Clinical gaze may refer to:
 General clinical experience by a physician
 Medical gaze, a dehumanizing medical separation of the patient's body from the patient's person (identity)